The Marshal is an American action-drama television series that aired on ABC for two seasons in 1995. The show starred Jeff Fahey as the title character, a United States Marshal charged with pursuing fugitives across the nation. In 1995, the episode "Hitwoman" was nominated for Outstanding Individual Achievement in Sound Editing for a Series at the 47th Primetime Emmy Awards.

Plot
Winston MacBride (Jeff Fahey) is a family man and fugitive-chasing Deputy U.S. Marshal who has never let a criminal get away. By tracking and guarding criminals, he wanders all over the country, meeting different people along the way. The wisecracking MacBride relies largely on his quirky sense of humor and intellect to fulfill his duties.

Production

Development
The idea for the program came when producer Carole Myers and a former law enforcement officer obtained a formal letter from the U.S. Marshals Service in Washington, D.C. and Myers presented the idea for a series based on the Marshals to Paramount Television, the TV arm of Paramount Pictures. After gaining Paramount's interest, Myers, who was formerly a special projects producer and publicist for Miami Vice, presented the project to Don Johnson, the former star of Miami Vice who had a production company based at Paramount.

Originally, the production was to be a reality series in the same vein that Cops was for police. After the Waco siege, however, the plan was dropped and the concept reworked into a dramatic series on Myers' recommendation. Johnson realized that no television series had specifically targeted the U.S. Marshals, the nation's oldest law enforcement agency, dating back more than 200 years. ABC, which had a somewhat long and successful relationship with Paramount since the late 1960s, picked up the series for its 1994–1995 schedule.

Casting
Johnson chose Jeff Fahey to play the lead character, Deputy U.S. Marshal Winston MacBride. Fahey had been a friend of Johnson's for years and guest-starred in the Miami Vice third season premiere "When Irish Eyes Are Crying". This casting was considered particularly crucial since MacBride would have no sidekick or other regular supporting characters to interact with. Not since The Fugitive had a crime drama focused so tightly on a single character. Guest stars were a regular part of the program's formula; the episode "Bounty Hunter", directed by Johnson, featured his former Miami Vice castmate John Diehl as a fugitive serial killer.

Filming
Due to the low shooting expense, The Marshal was filmed in Vancouver, British Columbia and Calgary, Alberta which would double as "Anytown, U.S.A."; due to the manhunt nature of the series, they would serve as a variety of cities. The show cost $1.5 million per episode which, rather than going to high salaries, went "directly onto the screen, making The Marshal look much more like a movie than a TV series".

Episodes

Season 1 (1995)

Season 2 (1995)

Broadcast
The Marshal debuted on Tuesday, January 31, 1995, as a midseason replacement. It then aired regularly on Saturdays opposite CBS' Walker, Texas Ranger and performed well enough in the ratings to be the only new ABC show to be renewed for the fall.

For its second season, ABC gave The Marshal a critical slot on its schedule. Leading off the network's Monday night lineup at 8:00 p.m., the series was to serve as the lead-in program for Monday Night Football; ABC had previously enjoyed moderate success with MacGyver on Monday night, with the show running there for six years.

The Marshal was also entering a much more competitive hour; CBS and NBC at the time aired successful situation comedy blocks on Mondays while Fox countered with the popular drama Melrose Place. Despite ABC's efforts, the ratings never rose to a satisfactory level for the network and The Marshal was cancelled, with the series coming to an end on Christmas Night just before the final Monday night game of the football season. The abbreviated season aired in reruns during the following summer.

Critical reception
Todd Everett gave a mediocre review of the series pilot and expected the series to "fade quickly from public consciousness". He also noted one humorous reference but described it as "fleeting" and expressed that the series could benefit from more of such humor. Everett added that "Fahey could turn into an appealing lead if given more opportunity to loosen up."

However, having seen multiple episodes, Ken Trucker of Entertainment Weekly gave the series a B+ and encouraged TV viewers to watch it. He noted that despite the "perfectly suited" Fahey's handsome looks, MacBride's best quality is his "air of fallibility" which offers an eccentric spoofing of the macho, heroic archetype. Trucker summed by stating: "At once true to action-show rules and properly parodic about the role of good guys in the late 20th century, The Marshal is an underrated pleasure."

David Kronke of the Los Angeles Times titled his review, Marshal' Shows Promise With Smart, Arresting Wit".

When the series was renewed for a second season, on May 29, 1995, John J. O'Connor of The New York Times wrote, The Marshal' is joining a select group of television series. The ABC show, which began with a "preview" in late January, is one of the few that have been renewed for next season. Furthermore, although its ratings were hardly sensational, 'The Marshall' is going into the strong 8 p.m. time slot just before 'Monday Night Football.' Meanwhile, the original run is being repeated on Mondays, beginning tonight."

When ABC canceled the show, Entertainment Weekly wrote in their Best and Worst 1995 article, "Best 'Melrose Place' Alternative The Marshal (ABC): On Mondays, this now-canceled Jeff Fahey actioner was funnier and more exciting than Melrose. All this and music by Van Dyke Parks, one of the year's more discreet pop secrets."

References

External links 

1995 American television series debuts
1995 American television series endings
American Broadcasting Company original programming
1990s American crime drama television series
Television series by CBS Studios
United States Marshals Service in fiction
Television shows filmed in Vancouver